Colcabamba (from Quechua: Qullqa Pampa, meaning "deposit plain") is one of sixteen districts of the Tayacaja Province in Peru.

Geography 
Other mountains are listed below:

Ethnic groups 
The people in the district are mainly Indigenous citizens of Quechua descent. Quechua is the language which the majority of the population (76.32%) learnt to speak in childhood, 23.21% of the residents started speaking using the Spanish language (2007 Peru Census).

References